Leland Moore Wilson (July 24, 1905 – January 17, 1970) was an American football player. He played college football for Cornell College and in the National Football League (NFL) as an end and back for the Minneapolis Red Jackets (1929-1930) and Frankford Yellow Jackets (1930-1931). He appeared in 26 NFL games, 18 as a starter.

References

1905 births
1970 deaths
Frankford Yellow Jackets players
Minneapolis Red Jackets players
Players of American football from Illinois
People from DeWitt County, Illinois
American football ends
Cornell Rams football players
American football defensive backs